In a Lotus Garden is a 1931 British musical film directed by Fred Paul and starring Roy Galloway, Jocelyn Yeo and H. Agar Lyons. It was made at Isleworth Studios as a quota quickie. The film's sets were designed by Norman G. Arnold.

Cast
  Roy Galloway as Lieutenant Dick Waring  
 Jocelyn Yeo as Margaret Leyland  
 H. Agar Lyons as Mandarin  
 Rita Cave as Son Tu  
 Jack Barnes as Cher Sang

References

Bibliography
 Chibnall, Steve. Quota Quickies: The Birth of the British 'B' Film. British Film Institute, 2007.
 Low, Rachael. Filmmaking in 1930s Britain. George Allen & Unwin, 1985.
 Wood, Linda. British Films, 1927-1939. British Film Institute, 1986.

External links

1931 films
British musical films
1931 musical films
Films directed by Fred Paul
Films shot at Isleworth Studios
Quota quickies
British black-and-white films
1930s English-language films
1930s British films